Arhopala denta  is a butterfly in the family Lycaenidae. It was described by William Harry Evans in 1957. It is found in the Indomalayan realm (Borneo).

References

External links

Arhopala Boisduval, 1832 at Markku Savela's Lepidoptera and Some Other Life Forms. Retrieved June 3, 2017.

Arhopala
Butterflies described in 1957